Marguerite Anne de Blonay (9 July 1897 – 18 July 1966) was a Swiss sculptor. Her work was part of the sculpture event in the art competition at the 1924 Summer Olympics.

References

1897 births
1966 deaths
19th-century Swiss sculptors
20th-century Swiss sculptors
Swiss women sculptors
Olympic competitors in art competitions
People from Bas-Rhin